Marc Antoine Auguste Gaudin (5 April 1804 – 2 August 1880) was a French chemist.

He was a pioneer in photography and contributed to the Avogadro's gas law by proposing that some elements form diatomic or polyatomic gas.

See also
Corundum
Gaudin Point
History of molecular theory
History of the camera

References

1804 births
1880 deaths
19th-century French chemists